Tancheng may refer to the following places in China:

Tancheng County (郯城县), Shandong
Tancheng, Anhui (坛城镇), town in Mengcheng County
Tancheng Subdistrict (潭城街道), Jianyang, Fujian
Tancheng, Pingtan County (潭城镇), Fuzhou, Fujian
Tancheng, Shandong (郯城镇), town in and seat of Tancheng County